The Kirkstall Training Ground, historically known as Clarence Fields, is a training facility in Leeds owned by Leeds Rhinos. The training facility is mostly used by Leeds Rhinos and is also used by Leeds Tykes (having originally been the home of their predecessors Headingley RUFC), National Conference League side Milford Marlins and  Leeds City College Rugby League team. It was used by Bramley RLFC as their home ground in 1995-96 following the sale of McLaren Field.

The ground and the lower floors of the buildings on site suffered significant damage in the Boxing Day Floods of 2015. Whilst the ground was repaired and cleaned, the rugby teams used other venues around the city. Leeds Rhinos manager, Gary Hetherington, suggested that the eventual clean up cost would be £6 million and it would not be until June 2016 at the earliest before the training centre could be used again.

References

Sports venues in Leeds
Leeds Rhinos
Leeds Tykes
Kirkstall